The PX domain is a phosphoinositide-binding structural domain involved in targeting of proteins to cell membranes.

This domain was first found in P40phox and p47phox domains of NADPH oxidase (phox stands for phagocytic oxidase). It was also identified in many other proteins involved in membrane trafficking, including nexins, Phospholipase D, and  phosphoinositide-3-kinases.

The PX domain is structurally conserved in eukaryotes, although amino acid sequences show little similarity. PX domains interact primarily with PtdIns(3)P lipids. However some of them bind to phosphatidic acid, PtdIns(3,4)P2,  PtdIns(3,5)P2, PtdIns(4,5)P2, and PtdIns(3,4,5)P3. The PX-domain can also interact with other domains and proteins.

Human proteins containing this domain 

Sorting nexins contain this domain. Other examples include:

 HS1BP3
 KIF16B (SNX23)
 NCF1; NCF1C; NCF4; NISCH
 PIK3C2A;   PIK3C2B;   PIK3C2G;   PLD1; PLD2; PXK
 RPS6KC1
 SGK3; SH3PXD2A; SNAG1; SNX9

References 

Peripheral membrane proteins
Protein domains